Tankcrimes is an independent punk rock and heavy metal record label owned by Scotty Heath and operated from his garage in Oakland, California. Tankcrimes currently has over 100 releases. Tankcrimes Day is officially February 1 and is intended to celebrate "friendship and noise."

Bands with releases on Tankcrimes
A.N.S.
Abscess
Agoraphobic Nosebleed
Annihilation Time
BAT
Brainoil
Cannabis Corpse
Cliterati
Connoisseur
Conquest for Death
Deadfall
Deathgrave
Deny the Cross
Direct Control
Despise You
Dystopia
Exhumed
Final Conflict
Fucked Up
Ghoul
Impaled
Iron Reagan
Kicker
Los Huaycos
Mortuous
Municipal Waste
Necrot
Peligro Social
Population Reduction
Strung Up
The Shrine
Spazz
Toxic Holocaust
Victims
Vitamin X
Vivisick
Voetsek

References

American independent record labels
Heavy metal record labels
Punk record labels
Companies based in Oakland, California